The Marine Pay Department was formed in 1755, and replaced the earlier Marine Pay Office that was established in 1702. It was responsible for processing marines' pay to the Royal Marine Divisions located at Chatham, Portsmouth, Plymouth and Woolwich. The department was initially administered by the Paymaster of the Marines whose title later changed to the Paymaster and Inspector General of Marines. In 1809 it absorbed the secretariat duties of the Marine Department. The department existed until 1831 as part of the Royal Marine Office when it was abolished and its duties transferred to the Navy Pay Office.

History
The Marine Pay Department was created in 1755. It succeeded the earlier Marine Pay Office that was established in 1702. The department was responsible for processing marines' pay to the Royal Marines Division's at Chatham, Portsmouth and Plymouth. The department was initially administered by the Paymaster of the Marines, whose title later changed to the Paymaster and Inspector General of Marines. In 1809 it absorbed the secretariat duties of the Marine Department. The department existed as a separate organisation from the military command of the Royal Marine Forces that were under direct control of the Board of Admiralty until 1825 when the Deputy Adjutant General was appointed to administer the Royal Marines and his office became known Royal Marine Office. This department existed until 1831 as department of the Royal Marine Office of the Department of Admiralty when it was abolished and its duties transferred to the Navy Pay Office of the Treasurer of the Navy. Following the abolition of the Marine Pay Department, a second class clerk in this Department William Robinson transferred to the Navy Board and promoted to Paymaster of the Marines to the Navy Board.

Location
The department was based at:

Head of department

Paymaster of the Marines
Included:
 1755–1756, William Adair
 1756–1757, George Campbell
 1757–1778, John Tucker
 1778–1792, Gabriel Steward
 1792–1803, The Hon. George Villiers

Paymaster and Inspector General of Marines
Included:
 1803–1810, The Hon. George Villiers
 1810–1812, The Hon. Edmund Phipps
 1812–1813, The Hon. Edward Richard Stewart
 1813–1815, Francis Hastings Doyle
 1815–1818, The Hon. Granville Anson Chetwynd Stapylton 
 1819–1831, Sir James Cockburn

Structure and offices under the Paymaster and Inspector General of Marines
Following the creation of the pay department the Paymaster of Marines was supported by a clerical staff consisting of the First Clerk Marine Pay Department later Chief Clerk of the Marine Pay Department who in turn was assisted by a Second Class Clerk who in turn was assisted by a Third Class Clerk. To this structure was added additional extra clerical staff. There also existed a Messengers Office and also an Office Keeper or in modern terms an Office Manager. Another group within this organisation were the Agents of the Marine Office reporting to this department but these based at the various Royal Marine Divisions regional headquarters.

First Class/Chief Clerks Office
Included:
 1755–1795, J. Madden
 1795–1797, E. Waters
 1797–1807, D. C. Webb
 1807–1808, E. Waters
 1808–1831, Thomas Hind

Second Class Clerks Office
Included:
 1795–1797, D. C. Webb
 1797–1807, T. Waller
 1807–1819, G. Gardner
 1819–1827, William Robinson (promoted to Paymaster of the Marines (Navy Board) in 1829
 1827–1831, J. Edwards

Third Class Clerks Office
This office usually consisted of three clerks holding the position at the same time and included:
 1819–1824, W. Brixey
 1819–1824, J. Edwards
 1819–1824, W. Gardner
 1824–1827, C. Cooper
 1827–1830, W. Bartmore
 1827–1830, H. Cooper
 1827–1830, R. Edwards
 1830–1831, C. W. Hind

Extra Clerks Office
Included:
 1800–1801, W. Robinson
 1801–1803, W. Brixey
 1803–1807, J. Edwards
 1807–1819, W. Gardner

Messengers Office
Included:
 1800–1809, T. Hayward
 1809–1813, R. Leader
 1813–1826, R. Pitts
 1826–1831, R. Elbourn

Office Keeper
Included:
 1824–1827, R. Glendenning
 1827–1831, W. H. Weaver

Agents of Marines
The Agent of Marines were officers of the Marine Pay Office established in 1756, one assigned to each of the three divisions and included:
 1756–1760, M. Guerin, (Plymouth)
 1756–1760, J. Winter, (Portsmouth)
 1756–1760, J. Baird, (Chatham)
 1760–1763, J. Clevland, (Plymouth)
 1763–1767, J. Clevland, (Chatham, Plymouth and Portsmouth)
 1767–1791, G. Williams, (Chatham, Plymouth and Portsmouth)
 1791–1800, C. Cox, (Chatham, Plymouth and Portsmouth)

Citations

Sources
 Archives, National (1688–1983). "Records of Royal Marines". nationalarchives.gov.uk. London, England: The National Archives. 
 'Marine pay department', in Office-Holders in Modern Britain: Volume 4, Admiralty Officials 1660–1870, ed. J C Sainty (London, 1975), pp. 85–90. British History Online http://www.british-history.ac.uk/office-holders/vol4/pp85-90 [accessed 3 January 2019].
 Office, Admiralty (January 1820). The Navy List. London, England: John Murray. 
 Office, Admiralty (December 1827). The Navy List. London, England: John Murray 
 Parliament, Great Britain. (1797) The Royal Kalendar and Court and City Register for England, Scotland, Ireland and the Colonies. W. March. London. England.
 Parliament, Great Britain. (1805) The Royal Kalendar and Court and City Register for England, Scotland, Ireland and the Colonies. W. March. London. England.

Admiralty departments